Brightside (formerly, Brightside Station) is an unincorporated community in Alameda County, California.

Train station 
The Brightside Station was a popular train station located in the area. However, it lost popularity and was shut down during the Great Depression.

References

External links
Niles Canyon Railway website

Unincorporated communities in California
Unincorporated communities in Alameda County, California